Le Masque de fer ("The Iron Mask") is a 1962 French film directed by Henri Decoin, based on the 1850 novel The Vicomte of Bragelonne: Ten Years Later by Alexandre Dumas and specifically part 3 of the novel, The Man in the Iron Mask; which in turn is based on the real-life story of the Man in the Iron Mask.

Synopsis 

Mazarin gives d'Artagnan the mission to rescue the imprisoned brother of Louis XIV.

In a scene not in the original book, d'Artagnan grabs Isabelle de Saint-Mars, pulls up her dress, and spanks her to punish her for not keeping a promise she had made.

Technical details 
 Director: Henri Decoin
 Writer: Laurent Devries, Gérald Devriès, Cécil Saint-Laurent after the works of Alexandre Dumas
 Producer: Roger de Broin
 Director of photography: Pierre Petit
 Music: Georges Van Parys
 Editing: Louisette Hautecoeur
 Scenery: Olivier Girard and Paul-Louis Boutié
 Genre: Adventure
 Length: 127 min
 Date of release: France, 1962

Starring 
Jean Marais: d'Artagnan
Jean-François Poron: Henri/Louis XIV
Sylva Koscina: Marion
Gisèle Pascal: Mme de Chaulmes
Jean Rochefort: Lastréaumont
Claudine Auger: Isabelle de Saint-Mars
Germaine Montero: Anne d'Autriche
Simone Derly: Marie Mancini
Noël Roquevert: Mr de Saint-Mars
Jean Lara: Renaud de Lourmes
Jean Davy: Maréchal de Turenne
Raymond Gérôme: Pimentel
Philippe Lemaire: Vaudreuil
Enrico Maria Salerno: Mazarin
Clément Thierry: Maulévrier
Max Montavon: le notaire

Notes

External links 
 

French adventure films
Italian adventure films
1960s adventure films
French swashbuckler films
Films directed by Henri Decoin
1962 films
Italian swashbuckler films
Films based on The Vicomte of Bragelonne: Ten Years Later
Cultural depictions of Louis XIV
Cultural depictions of Cardinal Mazarin
Man in the Iron Mask
Twins in fiction
1960s French films
1960s Italian films